The Endrosina are a subtribe of lichen moths in the family Erebidae.

Taxonomy
The subtribe was previously classified as the tribe Endrosini of the subfamily Lithosiinae of the family Arctiidae.

Genera
The following genera are included in the subtribe.  
Setina
Stigmatophora

References 

 
Lithosiini
Lepidoptera subtribes